The fruitcrows are several species of birds in the Cotinga family:

 Genus Gymnoderus.
 Bare-necked fruitcrow (Gymnoderus foetidus).
 Genus Haematoderus.
 Crimson fruitcrow (Haematoderus militaris).
 Genus Querula.
 Purple-throated fruitcrow (Querula purpurata).
 Genus Pyroderus.
 Red-ruffed fruitcrow (Pyroderus scutatus).

Animal common name disambiguation pages